Seth Copeland Payne (born February 12, 1975) is a former American football defensive tackle, who now co-hosts a local radio show.

Early life
Payne is descended from a long line of farmers from outside Victor, New York and went to high school at Victor Senior High School, graduating in 1993. In 1993, he was elected to the All-Greater Rochester and All State teams and also participated in the Eddie Meath All Star Game. He lived with his mother, stepfather, and two siblings.

He played college football at Cornell and was a member of the Sphinx Head Society and Delta Upsilon.

Professional career
Payne was originally drafted by the Jacksonville Jaguars in the fourth round of the 1997 NFL Draft.

He was selected by the Houston Texans in the Expansion Draft in 2002. He was selected along with Jaguar teammates Tony Boselli and Gary Walker. The move allowed the Jaguars to be under the salary cap. The move was surprising considering the Texans and Jaguars were in the same division.

On February 28, 2007 the Texans released him. He was signed by the Jaguars on August 18, re-joining the team with which he began his career.

Current information
Seth now lives with his wife, Brandi Unverdorben Payne, and his child, Alex Payne in Houston, Texas. Seth’s brother is current Rugby America’s CEO Dan Payne.

He co-hosts, with Sean Pendergast, the morning show for SportsRadio 610 called Payne & Pendergast, and hosts a podcast called "The Deceptively Fast Podcast".

References

External links
 Seth Payne player card, ESPN.com

1975 births
Living people
American football defensive tackles
Cornell Big Red football players
Jacksonville Jaguars players
Houston Texans players
People from Clifton Springs, New York
People from Victor, New York
Ed Block Courage Award recipients